Benign cephalic histiocytosis not to be confused with "Neonatal cephalic pustulosis" is a rare skin condition affecting boys and girls equally, characterized by skin lesions that initially present on the head in all cases, often the cheeks, eyelids, forehead, and ears.

See also 
 Childhood granulomatous periorificial dermatitis
 Non-X histiocytosis
 List of cutaneous conditions

References

External links 

Monocyte- and macrophage-related cutaneous conditions